Károly Erős (born 20 December 1971 in Pilisvörösvár) is a Hungarian football player who currently plays for and manages NB III team, Monor.

External links
 Profile on hlsz.hu 
 
Profile on Nemzeti Sport

References

1971 births
Living people
Hungarian footballers
Hungary international footballers
Újpest FC players
People from Pilisvörösvár
Association football midfielders
Sportspeople from Pest County